Pentila christina is a butterfly in the family Lycaenidae. It is found in Cameroon, the Republic of the Congo and the Democratic Republic of the Congo (Ituri and North Kivu).

References

Butterflies described in 1904
Poritiinae